Diporiphora ameliae is a species of agama found in Australia.

References

Diporiphora
Agamid lizards of Australia
Taxa named by Patrick J. Couper
Taxa named by Stephanie N.J. Chapple
Taxa named by Jane Melville
Reptiles described in 2012